Bryotropha similis is a moth of the family Gelechiidae. It has a Holarctic distribution, including Greenland and Iceland. It is widespread in northern, central and eastern Europe. In southern Europe, it is only known from a few mountainous regions. It is also found throughout the Palaearctic.

The wingspan is 11–13 mm. The forewings are glossy blackish brown and the hindwings are fuscous, but darker towards the apex. Adults have been recorded on wing from early June to late August, probably in one generation per year.

Larvae have been recorded on old walls covered with mosses and have also been found under moss both on walls and on boulders and stones on the ground. The larvae have a brown body and dark brown head.

References

Moths described in 1854
similis
Moths of Asia
Moths of Europe
Moths of North America